The Palestinian government is the government of the Palestinian Authority or State of Palestine. The Executive Committee of the Palestine Liberation Organization (EC) is the highest executive body of the Palestine Liberation Organization and acts as the government. Since June 2007, there have been two separate administrations in Palestine, one in the West Bank and the other in the Gaza Strip. The government on the West Bank was generally recognised as the Palestinian Authority Government. On the other hand, the government in the Gaza Strip claimed to be the legitimate government of the Palestinian Authority. Until June 2014, when the Palestinian Unity Government was formed, the government in the West Bank was the Fatah-dominated Palestinian government of 2013. In the Gaza Strip the government was the Hamas government of 2012. Following two Fatah–Hamas Agreements in 2014, on 25 September 2014 Hamas agreed to let the PA Government resume control over the Gaza Strip and its border crossings with Egypt and Israel, but that agreement had broken down by June 2015, after President Abbas said the PA government was unable to operate in the Gaza Strip.

History
The following organizations have claimed or exercised authority over the Palestinian people in the past:
Arab Higher Committee, the central political organ of the Arab community of Mandatory Palestine. It was established on 25 April 1936 and was sidestepped by the All-Palestine Government in 1948.
First Committee 1936-1937 (Arab Higher Committee)
Second Committee 1945-1948 (Arab Higher Committee)
All-Palestine Government, a Palestinian entity set-up by the Arab League in Egyptian occupied Gaza Strip on 22 September 1948. It was dissolved by Egypt in 1959.
Palestine Liberation Organization has been the official representative of the Palestinian people internationally since 1964. On 22 November 1974, United Nations General Assembly Resolution 3236 recognized the right of the Palestinian people to self-determination, national independence and sovereignty in Palestine. It also recognized the PLO as the sole legitimate representative of the Palestinian people, and accorded it observer status in the United Nations.
Executive Committee of the Palestine Liberation Organization (EC) is the highest executive body of the PLO. Mahmoud Abbas has been Chairman of the EC since the death of Yasser Arafat in November 2004. The EC represents the Palestinian people, supervises the various PLO bodies, executes the policies and decisions of the PNC, and handles the PLO’s financial issues. The EC represents the PLO internationally, and acts as the government of the State of Palestine.

PNA governments

Palestinian National Authority was formally an interim administrative body established by the PLO pursuant to the Oslo Accords of 1993. Pursuant to the Oslo Accords, the PA Government had only authority over some civil rights of the Palestinians in the West Bank Areas A and B and in the Gaza Strip, and over internal security in Area A and in Gaza. One of the security tasks was the security cooperation between Israel and the Palestinian Authority, which among other things aimed at the prevention of Palestinian attacks on the Israeli army and settlers. Until 2007 it exercised control of populated areas in Area A and B of the West Bank and in the Gaza Strip:

 Palestinian Authority Government of 1996 - formed following the first general elections held on 20 January 1996. It was headed by Chairman of the PLO Yasser Arafat, and functioned until 29 April 2003.
 Palestinian government of October 2002 (PNA)
 Palestinian government of November 2003 (PNA)
 Palestinian government of March 2006 (PNA)
 Palestinian government of March 2007 (PNA, unity of Hamas and Fatah)

Split of Fatah and Hamas
Since June 2007, the Fatah-led governments have exercised authority in Ramallah, West Bank, and has been recognized as the official government of the Palestinian Authority; while since Hamas took control in the Gaza Strip, it has exercised de facto control there, ousting Fatah PNA representatives in June 2007.
 Fatah government in the West Bank
 Palestinian governments of June–July 2007 (PNA, Fatah)
 Palestinian government of 2009 (PNA, Fatah)
 Palestinian governments of 2013 (PNA, Fatah) - two governments were formed in 2013, in June and September, after the upgrade in the United Nations of Palestine to the status of non-member observer state. Both were led by Rami Hamdallah.
 Palestinian government of 2015 (PNA, Fatah) - led by Hamdallah.
 Palestinian government of 2019 (PNA, Fatah) - the 18th Palestinian government since the establishment of the PA in 2004, led by Mohammad Shtayyeh, member of the Fatah Central Committee, the 23-member government includes 16 new ministers.
 Governance of the Gaza Strip
 First Hamas government 2007-12 (Hamas Administration in Gaza)
 Second Hamas government September 2012-14 (Hamas Administration in Gaza)
 Third Hamas government 2016–present is the Gaza-based Hamas-dominated de facto government in Gaza. It is made up of Deputy Ministers, Directors General and other high-level officials, not directly bound to the Ramallah administration. It was initially speculated that the 2016 Hamas government is an attempt by Ismail Haniyeh to return to full control of the Gaza enclave. The United States, Canada, the European Union, Japan and Israel classify Hamas as a terrorist organization and do not recognize the government. Hamas government is not recognized by the Ramallah administration of the State of Palestine.
 Palestinian Unity Government
 The Palestinian Unity Government was formed on 2 June 2014, following the Fatah-Hamas Reconciliation Agreement of 23 April 2014. However, the Government was not presented for approval by the Legislative Council, leading to its legitimacy being questioned. The ministers were nominally independent, but overwhelmingly seen as loyal to President Abbas and his Fatah movement or to smaller leftist factions, none of whom were believed to have close ties to Hamas. A feature of this government is the appointment of Deputy Ministers, Directors General and other high-level officials for Gaza, and not directly bound to the Ramallah administration. The government of 2014 resigned on 17 June 2015, under protest from Hamas which was not consulted. In July and December 2015, Abbas reshuffled the cabinet and appointed new ministers without consulting Hamas, which was denounced by Hamas. Although Hamas did not recognize the new ministers and rejected the changes, the reshuffling was called "technical and not political", and the new cabinet was presented as a slightly changed  existing government, still called "consensus government".

See also

Finance Minister of the Palestinian National Authority
Foreign Affairs Minister of the Palestinian National Authority
Foreign relations of Palestine
Foreign relations of the Palestine Liberation Organization
International recognition of the State of Palestine
Israeli Civil Administration
Palestinian Declaration of Independence
Palestinian Ambassador to the United Nations

References

 
Government of the State of Palestine